Schwartziella sanmartini is a species of minute sea snail, a marine gastropod mollusk or micromollusk in the family Zebinidae.

Description
The height of the shell attains 5 m.

Distribution
This species occurs in the Atlantic Ocean off the Cape Verdes.

References

 Rolán E. & Luque Á.A. 2000. The subfamily Rissoininae (Mollusca: Gastropoda: Rissoidae) in the Cape Verde Archipelago (West África). Iberus 18(1): 21-94
 Rolán E., 2005. Malacological Fauna From The Cape Verde Archipelago. Part 1, Polyplacophora and Gastropoda.

sanmartini
Gastropods of Cape Verde
Gastropods described in 2000